José Alberto Suárez Giraldo (born 22 February 1961) is a Colombian football manager, currently in charge of Envigado.

Career
Born in Cali, Suárez began his career with Categoría Primera B side River Plate de Buga in the 1995–96 season. In August 1996, he took over fellow league team Lanceros Boyacá, and moved to Cortuluá in the following year; in May 1998, he resigned from the latter.

In 2000, after a short period at Deportivo Pereira, Suárez joined América de Cali to work in the club's youth categories. For the 2004 season, he was named first team manager of América, after being an interim during the 2002 campaign.

Suárez left América in 2005, and subsequently managed Unión Magdalena in that year. He returned to Cortuluá in 2006, leaving in 2008 to work at C.D. Escuela Carlos Sarmiento Lora as a coach.

Suárez returned to managerial duties on 6 June 2013, after taking over Jaguares de Córdoba. He was named in charge of Cúcuta Deportivo on 12 June 2014, but resigned the following 9 March.

Suárez returned to América de Cali on 13 August 2015, as the club was struggling to achieve promotion from the second division. He left the club in April of the following year, and was subsequently replaced by Hernán Torres; América went on to finally achieve promotion back to the top tier as champions.

On 2 January 2017, Suárez was named at the helm of second division side Deportes Quindío. After three seasons missing out promotion in the final stages, he left the club, and returned to Jaguares on 17 July 2020.

Suárez opted to leave Jaguares in May 2021, and was named manager of Envigado shortly after.

References

External links

1961 births
Living people
Sportspeople from Cali
Colombian football managers
Categoría Primera A managers
Deportivo Pereira managers
América de Cali managers
Unión Magdalena managers
Cúcuta Deportivo managers
Deportes Quindío managers
Envigado F.C. managers
Jaguares de Córdoba managers